Deuterocohnia lotteae is a plant species in the genus Deuterocohnia. This species is endemic to Bolivia at altitudes of 2500–3000 meters.

Synonyms
 Abromeitiella lotteae Rauh

References

 Bradea 6: 145 1992.
 
 The Plant List entry
 eFloras Bolivia Checklist entry

lotteae
Flora of Bolivia